The Lochen is a mountain of Baden-Württemberg, Germany. It is located in Zollernalbkreis, southwestern Germany, and part of the mountain range Swabian Jura.

Mountains and hills of the Swabian Jura
Zollernalbkreis